The Sisters of the Holy Family (SSF; French: Soeurs de la Sainte Famille) are a Catholic religious order of African-American nuns based in New Orleans, Louisiana. They were founded in 1837 as the Congregation of the Sisters of the Presentation of the Blessed Virgin Mary by Henriette DeLille, adopting the current name in 1842. They were the second Black religious order in the United States, after Mother Mary Lange's Oblate Sisters of Providence.

History 
Around 1829, Henriette DeLille joined Juliette Gaudin, a Haitian, and Josephine Charles and began efforts to evangelize New Orleans enslaved persons and free persons of color. Around 1836, they formed the Congregation of the Sisters of the Presentation of the Blessed Virgin Mary, New Orleans' first confraternity of women of color.

Their unofficial habit was a plain blue dress, as they were not allowed by Bishop Antoine Blanc to wear real habits due to their being Black.

The congregation was established under the current name in 1842. They began as a diocesan congregation and were assisted by Marie Jeanne Aliquot, who as a white French woman was prevented by law from joining a congregation of women of color. The Religious of the Sacred Heart provided Henriette, Juliette and Josephine spiritual formation and experience in formal religious community living.

The Association of the Holy Family, a lay group of free persons of color contributed financially, and helped found the Hospice of the Holy Family, for the elderly sick and poor. Now called the Lafon Nursing Facility, it served a long term care facility and is the first and oldest Catholic nursing home in the United States. The sisters would take in sick and elderly women, providing care at their house on St. Bernard Avenue. After Hurricane Katrina in 2005, it was restored and reopened in 2010, and continues to provide nursing care.

In 1850 the order founded a school for girls. The sisters also provided a home for orphans and taught slaves at a time under Louisiana law when educating slaves was illegal.

They took private vows on November 21, 1852, as Bishop Antoine Blanc would not allow Black women to make public vows. He also did not allow them to publicly wear habits.

Father Etienne Rousselou, the congregation's advisor, named DeLille mother superior. She took the name Sister Mary Theresa; however, everyone called her Mother Henriette.

Their school, St. Mary's Academy, first opened on Chartres Street in December 1867. 

In 1876, the sisters were finally allowed to wear their habits publicly. In 1887, their formal rule was approved by the bishop.

The academy moved to the Quadroon Ballroom on Orleans Avenue in 1881, and in 1921 the sisters assumed responsibility for a school for children of color from St. Francis de Sales Church; that school had been previously run by the Sisters of the Most Holy Sacrament.

SMA moved onto Chef Menteur Boulevard in New Orleans East in 1965.

The congregation has maintained their original ministries of educating youth and caring for the aged, and the poor. They have missions in Louisiana, Texas, California, Washington, D.C., and Belize. The sisters remain active in pastoral care and education ministry in Opelousas, Lafayette, and Ville Platte in the Diocese of Lafayette.

Organization and membership
The Sisters of the Holy Family is a congregation of pontifical right. The motherhouse is in New Orleans, and as of 2015 its members numbered 96 sisters.

The order is headquartered a block away from the school. Their mission statement says:

“We exemplify and share the spirituality and charism of Henriette Delille with the people of God.  We bring healing comfort to children, the elderly, the poor, and the powerless, especially those of African descent. As we embrace the third millennium, our love for God compels us to confront racism, all forms of injustice, discrimination, and economic oppression through evangelization and education.”

Legacy 
The National Museum of African American History and Culture includes historic items from black Catholic communities, including Sisters of the Holy Family.

Due to some Sisters attending Xavier University of Louisiana, and working alongside the Sisters of the Blessed Sacrament, Xavier University Archives & Special Collections also holds a small collection on the history of the Sisters of the Holy Family.

In popular media 
The actress Vanessa Williams produced a 2000 television movie, The Courage to Love, about Henriette Delille, in which she herself starred in the lead role.

References

External links
 The Sisters of the Holy Family
 Council of Major Superiors of Women Religious, Sisters of the Holy Family page
 Orrick, Lucy Semmes, "Along the Color Line", National Magazine, November 1904

Catholic female orders and societies
Religious organizations established in 1837
African-American Roman Catholicism
Catholic religious institutes established in the 19th century
1837 establishments in Louisiana
Sisters of the Holy Family (Louisiana)